Lehmannia melitensis is a species of air-breathing land slug, a shell-less pulmonate gastropod mollusk in the family Limacidae.

Distribution
The distribution of this species includes Malta and  Italy (Sicily, Aeolian Islands, Sardinia, and the Tuscan Archipelago). It also has been found in Tunisia and Algeria.

References

External links 

 AnimalBase info

Limacidae
Gastropods described in 1882